The 1959–60 season was Chelsea Football Club's forty-sixth competitive season.

Table

References

External links
 1959–60 season at stamford-bridge.com

1959–60
English football clubs 1959–60 season